Asaphodes mnesichola is a species of moth in the family Geometridae. It is endemic to New Zealand and has been observed in the South Island. This species inhabits subalpine native scrub. Adults of this species are on the wing in January and February.

Taxonomy

This species was described by Edward Meyrick in 1888 as Larentia mnesichola using material collected by Meyrick at Mount Arthur. Hudson discussed and illustrated this species in 1898 as Xanthorhoe mnesichola. He also discussed and illustrated this moth under this same name in his 1928 book The Butterflies and Moths of New Zealand. In 1971 John S. Dugdale placed this species within the genus Asaphodes. This placement was confirmed by Dugdale in 1988. The lectotype specimen is held at the Natural History Museum, London.

Description 
Meyrick described this species as follows:

Distribution
This species is endemic to New Zealand and has been observed in the South Island.

Habitat 
This species inhabits subalpine scrub.

Behaviour 
The adults of this species are on the wing in January and February.

References

Larentiinae
Moths described in 1888
Moths of New Zealand
Endemic fauna of New Zealand
Taxa named by Edward Meyrick
Endemic moths of New Zealand